The Suicide of Ajax Vase depicting the suicide of Ajax is a neck amphora, painted in the black-figure style.  It is now in the Château-musée de Boulogne-sur-Mer in France.  The painter was Exekias, who made this work in Athens at the end of the Archaic Period, around 530 BC. The scene shows Ajax preparing for his suicide, a unique scene in Ancient Greek art.  Black-figure is a technique for pottery decoration where the painter would paint the figures in black paint and leave the background as unpainted clay. Ajax appears in the middle, bent over his sword which he is placing in the ground. There is a tree to one side of him and his suit of armor to the other side. There is a line of geometric decoration at the top of the scene and at the bottom of the amphora.

Exekias 

Exekias is a well-known Greek artist. He put images of the Trojan War, and Ajax in particular, on his work quite often. Ajax appears on his work more than any other Greek artist's work. Ajax was supposedly born on the island of Salamis, which is where Exekias is believed to be from. Some scholars infer that this connection is one of the reasons Exekias chooses to depict Ajax so often. Exekias is known for being able to show tension and emotion in scenes very well.

Myth 

Ajax was considered the second-best hero at Troy, after his cousin Achilles. Once Achilles dies, Ajax and Odysseus debate over who should receive his armor. When Odysseus is given the armor, Ajax goes mad. He kills Greek cattle believing that it is the Greeks. Once he becomes aware of what he has done, he commits suicide. Ajax believes that after the cattle incident, killing himself is the only way to keep his status as a hero and to avoid bringing shame to his noble father Telamon.

Details 

Most scenes in Greek art are the climax of a story, such as battles and other active subjects. However, Exekias chooses to show Ajax preparing for his suicide, which no other known images of this event do. There are other representations of Ajax's suicide, including a Middle Protocorinthian aryballos, an Athenian ivory comb, and sixth century Corinthian vases. All of these show Ajax once he has already done the act of falling on his sword. Exekias shows Ajax planting his sword in the ground. He is nude, which shows his vulnerability in this moment. A single palm tree adds to the isolation of the scene.

References 

Amphorae
6th century BC in Greece